Newslookup.com is a news search engine, news headline, news feed and news services provider established in 2000, by Michael Kynast. The search engine crawls several thousand news media sites providing time based live run down of headlines by region, topic or person and provides configurable filtered search results.

Search Engine Key features 

Configurable options at search time:

 Search by media type: Newspapers, Television, Radio, Internet.
 Search by source region of news company.
 Limit results by HTML document parts, such as HTML meta keywords, meta description, document title and document body.
 Search by news site.
 Boolean query language support.
 Phrase support.
 Cached copies of crawled documented when allowed by robots.txt and meta robots.
 Results sorting by relevance and date.
 Group results by site or non-grouped.

History 

Newslookup.com is the first news search engine to allow users to search by source region of the news organization and categorize by news media type (Newspapers, Television, Radio, Internet). This includes allowing the user to search and display results by document parts, including document body, meta keywords and meta description.

In early 2004 Newslookup.com began presenting lead news headline history from top news sites in a fashion referred to as region and topical editions.  In addition a news wire service was launched by site, region and topic that provided RSS feeds for many international and top news sites lacking this service.

External links
Newslookup.com, Official page

References

Internet search engines
American news websites
News aggregators